The 1908 Minnesota gubernatorial election took place on November 3, 1908. Democratic Party of Minnesota candidate John Albert Johnson defeated Republican Party of Minnesota challenger Jacob F. Jacobson.

Results

See also
 List of Minnesota gubernatorial elections

External links
 http://www.sos.state.mn.us/home/index.asp?page=653
 http://www.sos.state.mn.us/home/index.asp?page=657

Minnesota
Gubernatorial
1908
November 1908 events